Khichan is a village in Rajasthan state of India. It is located in the Phalodi tehsil of Jodhpur district. The village is known for a large number of demoiselle cranes that visit it every winter. This annual bird migration began with around a hundred cranes in the 1970s, when a local couple started feeding pigeons. Other villagers joined their efforts, and as of 2014, Khichan now hosts over 30,000 demoiselle cranes from as early as August each year to as late as March of the following year.

Demographics 

According to the 2011 census of India, the population of the village is 7025, including 3729 males and 3296 females. The village is home to 1190 families.

The village has a number of Marwari Jain families. Sthanakvasi Jain monks Prakashchand (leader of Gyan Gutch sampradaya) and Uttamchandji (leader of Samrath Gutch sampradaya) were born in this village.

Transport 

Khichan is a desert village located 150 km west of Jodhpur city. The nearest town is Phalodi, which is 3.4 km away. Phalodi is a railway station on the broad gauge line and connects all important towns in Rajasthan. Phalodi Railway station lies on the broad gauge line of the Delhi- Jaisalmer and Bikaner - Jaisalmer train route. There are three trains from Jodhpur and three from Jaisalmer. A direct train also runs from Delhi.
Jodhpur is the nearest airport and from there the village is well connected by road (139 km). Bikaner(156 km. towards north), Nagaur (145 km in east) and Jaisalmer (165 km in west) are also connected to the village. The Pakistan Border is about 100 km away. National Highway No.15 skirts towards Phalodi.

Demoiselle cranes 

In the 1970s, Ratanlal Maloo, a native of Khichan who had been working in Odisha, returned to the village. Since he did not have a lot of work, his uncle gave him the job of feeding pigeons. Being devout Jain, Ratanlal and his wife accepted the task. Ratanlal would carry grain sacks to the feeding place, and his wife would help him spread the grains on the ground. A number of pigeons, sparrows and squirrels started coming to the place; peacocks also occasionally visited the place. In September, a dozen demoiselle cranes (called kurja in Rajasthani) also joined the other birds. These birds had been seen visiting the farmlands of Kheechan earlier. During September-February, around 100 cranes came to the feeding place. During the next winter, around 150 cranes visited the place. As the cranes grew in numbers, the local dogs started hunting them. So, Ratan Lal asked the village panchayat to allot him some land on the outskirts of the village. Some of the villagers joined him in building a chugga ghar ("bird feeding home"), with a granary and a fence. Several Jain traders supported the initiative by supplying grains. What started initially as a few dozen visiting birds has now become a major migration with thousands of cranes visiting the village year after year, during the period of August to March, and the number is reported to be increasing. This is attributed to the organised and natural feeding done by the village community, twice a day during the birds entire sojourn to the town in the months of August to March, with November to February being the peak season.

In 2010, the number of cranes visiting Kheechan was estimated at 15,000. The village achieved international recognition when it was featured in Birding World magazine in an article titled, "Khichan - the Demoiselle Crane village". It has now become popular among bird watchers.

Daily routine of Khichan cranes 

The cranes fly into specially created rectangular enclosures of 50x60m, at the edge of the village, called locally as ''chugga ghar's, where they have a breakfast session which lasts for about 90 minutes. They are fed in groups, one after the other. Their flights, in the setting of the conventional mansions (some of them are heritage buildings being converted to tourist lodges) of the village, present brilliant photo-ops for the large number of tourists who flock to the village for bird watching. After feeding, the cranes, in large congregations, are seen at some of the water bodies (ponds) and sand dunes to the north of Khichan. Peafowl are the other dominant birds seen around the cranes.

The cranes fly in different directions in small family flocks, in a disciplined order led by the female, followed closely by two young ones with the male forming the rear guard. Again, during mid day, they assemble for a drink, followed by an occasional bath, and a second feed. Acrobatic exhibition of mutual affection between couples is also seen. They roost in far away agriculture fields and return to the same water bodies next day, early in the morning.

Support community 

Currently, the daily feed of the birds is managed by Pakshi Chuggha Ghar of A. B. Khichan Jain Shree Sangh. Donations by locals and tourists support the cause. Previously, monetary donations from local people and visitors were managed by Kuraj Samrakshan Vikas Sansthan, a society established in Khichan for crane protection and care. The Marwar Crane Foundation (MCF) also supports the villagers' efforts.

Gallery

References 

Villages in Jodhpur district
Tourist attractions in Jodhpur district